Velichkovo is a village located in Pazardzhik Municipality, in Pazardzhik Province, southern Bulgaria.

References

Villages in Pazardzhik Province